Terence Steele (born June 4, 1997) is an American football offensive tackle for the Dallas Cowboys of the National Football League (NFL). He played college football at Texas Tech.

Early years
Steele attended Byron P. Steele High School. As a senior, he was the starter at left tackle, receiving All-District 25-6A and San Antonio Express-News first team All-Area honors.

Steele was considered a three-star recruit, the No. 1,844 overall prospect, the No. 179 offensive tackle and the No. 239 overall player in Texas in his class, according to the average of the major recruiting services. He committed to Texas Tech over offers from BYU, North Texas and UTSA.

College career
As a redshirt freshman, Steele played under future NFL head coach Kliff Kingsbury. He started the first 10 games at left tackle, before being moved to right tackle for the last two contests. Steele blocked for future NFL quarterback Patrick Mahomes, while contributing to the team leading the nation in passing yards and total offense. He was named to the All-Big 12 freshman team.

As a sophomore, Steele started all 13 games at right tackle, contributing to the team ranking in the top 25 nationally in passing yards (ninth), total offense (16th) and scoring (23rd).

As a junior, he started all 12 games at right tackle, contributing to the team ranking in the top 20 nationally in passing yards per game (third), total offense (12th), scoring (16th) and sacks allowed (sixth).

As a senior, Steele was forced to miss the first two games due to a preseason injury, breaking his streak of 37 consecutive starts. He started 10 games at right tackle and was part of an offensive line that allowed 18 sacks during his senior season. Steele finished his college career with 47 starts and received honorable-mention honors as All-Big 12 following his junior and senior seasons for the Red Raiders. At the end of the season, he participated in the 2020 Senior Bowl and the NFL Scouting Combine.

Professional career

Steele was signed as an undrafted free agent by the Dallas Cowboys after the 2020 NFL Draft on April 27. Because of the season-ending injury to starting right tackle La'el Collins and backup Cameron Erving having to miss time with different injuries, Steele was pressed into the starting lineup for the Cowboys, becoming just the fourth offensive tackle in the Super Bowl era, and the ninth in league history, to start at least 14 contests as an undrafted rookie. In the season opener against the Los Angeles Rams, he was able to hold his own until giving up a crucial sack on the final drive, as the offense was attempting to tie the contest. In the third game, against the Seattle Seahawks, he was replaced in the third quarter with Zack Martin. In the fourth game, against the Cleveland Browns, he gave up a sack that caused a fumble, in what proved to be a game-changing play in the 38–49 loss. He was benched for the tenth game, against the Minnesota Vikings, with Martin taking over the right tackle position. In the eleventh game, against  Washington, both Martin and Erving went down with injuries, so Steele was forced to start the rest of the season. Although he mostly struggled with his play, the team continued to start him and was able to show improvement in the final month. He played in all 16 games, with 14 starts.

As of November 28, 2021, Steele had started 10 games for the Dallas Cowboys during the 2021 season, including even after longtime starter La'el Collins returned from suspension. From weeks 2–8, he started at right tackle, and then started three games at left tackle after Tyron Smith was injured. Steele missed the week 13 game after being placed on the COVID-19 list.  On December 26 against the Washington Football Team, Terence Steele reported as an eligible receiver and caught his first NFL touchdown from Dak Prescott. During a Week 14 game against the Houston Texans on December 11, 2022, Steele suffered a torn ACL and MCL, ending his season.

References

External links
Texas Tech Red Raiders bio

1997 births
Living people
Players of American football from Texas
American football offensive tackles
Texas Tech Red Raiders football players
People from Cibolo, Texas
Dallas Cowboys players
Byron P. Steele High School alumni